Hocine Khalfi (January 7, 1928August 27, 2011) (commonly misspelled, "Hoacine")  was an Algerian-French boxer from Oran, Algeria.  He was orphaned at the age of seven and raised by his aunt.  Khalfi, who started boxing at the age of 17, quickly rose through the ranks. He was the featherweight champion of Algeria in 1945. Named "Golden Glove," Hocine found himself in Paris where he began to deliver his first professional battles; He was only 18 years old. Over his 9-year career (1948–1957), Khalfi scored 16 knockouts. His final record was 47-22-7.

Professional career

Khalfi is best known for his May 1954 defeat of Sandy Saddler in major upset bout. During his career he fought notable fighters such as Cisco Andrade, Ralph Dupas, and  Fernando Silva. On March 9, 1956 he was the main event at Madison Square Garden against Ludwig Lightburn. Preoccupied by the birth of his twin daughters, Lallia and Myriam, Khalfi lost the bout. 
The following day, the New York Journal said that it was the first time in boxing history that a main event was lost due to the birth of twins; The title of the article read: "Khalfi's Pilot Has Twin Alibi".

Television / film appearances

During his attendance of a taping of The Ed Sullivan Show, he was pulled on stage by Ed Sullivan, who was a big boxing fan.

The 1954 edition of Boxing and Wrestling Magazine, of which Khalfi appeared the cover and had a featured article, was shown in the movie Shutter Island, starring Leonardo DiCaprio.

After boxing

Khalfi retired from boxing in 1957, aged 29, due to a recurrent eye ulcer that he sustained in one of his fights.  He later became a chef working at such notable places as the Waldorf-Astoria Hotel, Beverly Hills Hotel, and Ambassador Hotel (Los Angeles). He lived in Los Angeles, California before moving to France in March, 2008; and later moving back to Algeria.

Khalfi died on August 27, 2011 from pancreatic cancer, aged 83, in his hometown of Oran, Algeria leaving behind 3 daughters (Lallia, Myriam, and Nadia), 6 grandchildren, and 8 great-grandchildren.

References

External links
 
http://news80.com/en/2011/09/06/hocine-khalfi-un-grand-boxeur-parti-en-silence/

1928 births
2011 deaths
Lightweight boxers
Algerian male boxers
Sportspeople from Oran
Algerian emigrants to the United States
American people of Algerian descent
American male boxers